Adam Parada (born October 21, 1981) is an American-born Mexican former professional basketball player. He played most notably as an import in the Philippine Basketball Association for the Alaska Aces. He played four years at the University of California, Irvine, but was not drafted by any team in the 2004 NBA Draft. He became a mainstay of the Mexico national team. He first played as an import for the Red Bull Barako in 2008 and led the Barako to a third-place finish, becoming the first Latin American reinforcement in an Asian league.

Pan American Games
Pan American Games 2011  Silver Medal

Centrobasket
Centrobasket 2014  Gold Medal

References 
 RealGM profile
 PBA Online! Profile
 Minnesota Timberwolves Summer League

1981 births
Living people
2014 FIBA Basketball World Cup players
Alaska Aces (PBA) players
American men's basketball players
Barako Bull Energy Boosters players
Basketball players at the 2011 Pan American Games
Basketball players from California
Centers (basketball)
Correcaminos UAT Victoria players
Fuerza Regia de Monterrey players
Halcones de Xalapa players
Huntsville Flight players
Daegu KOGAS Pegasus players
Indios de Mayagüez basketball players
Mexican expatriate sportspeople in Japan
Mexican men's basketball players
Nagoya Diamond Dolphins players
Pan American Games medalists in basketball
Pan American Games silver medalists for Mexico
People from Alta Loma, Rancho Cucamonga, California
Philippine Basketball Association imports
Pioneros de Quintana Roo players
Sportspeople from San Bernardino County, California
Tecolotes UAG players
Tijuana Zonkeys players
UC Irvine Anteaters men's basketball players
Zain Club basketball players
Medalists at the 2011 Pan American Games
Mexican expatriate basketball people in the Philippines